Robert Allen Grant (July 31, 1905 – March 2, 1998) was a United States representative from Indiana and later a United States district judge of the United States District Court for the Northern District of Indiana.

Education and career

Born near Bourbon, Indiana, Grant moved to Hamlet, Indiana in 1912 and to South Bend, Indiana in 1922. He attended the public schools and received an Artium Baccalaureus degree, cum laude, from the University of Notre Dame in 1928, and a Juris Doctor, also cum laude, from Notre Dame Law School in 1930. He was admitted to the bar in 1930 and commenced practice in South Bend. He married Margaret A. McLaren on September 17, 1933. He was a deputy prosecuting attorney of St. Joseph County, Indiana in 1935 and 1936, returning to private practice until 1938.

Congressional service

Grant was elected as a Republican to the Seventy-sixth and to the four succeeding Congresses, from January 3, 1939, to January 3, 1949. He was an unsuccessful candidate for reelection to the Eighty-first Congress in 1948, and resumed the practice of law in South Bend.

Federal judicial service

On August 21, 1957, Grant was nominated by President Dwight D. Eisenhower to a seat on the United States District Court for the Northern District of Indiana vacated by Judge W. Lynn Parkinson. Grant was confirmed by the United States Senate on August 22, 1957, and received his commission on August 26, 1957. He served as Chief Judge from 1961 to 1972 and as a member of the Judicial Conference of the United States from 1969 to 1972, assuming senior status on December 1, 1972. In 1976, he was appointed by Chief Justice Warren E. Burger to the United States Temporary Emergency Court of Appeals, serving until 1993. He was also a visiting judge for twelve terms at the United States District Court for the District of Puerto Rico. Grant continued to serve in senior status until his death on March 2, 1998, in Sarasota, Florida.

Honor

On September 25, 1992, the divisional courthouse for South Bend was rededicated as the Robert A. Grant Federal Building and U.S. Courthouse.

References

Sources
 
 
 

1905 births
1998 deaths
Judges of the United States District Court for the Northern District of Indiana
United States district court judges appointed by Dwight D. Eisenhower
20th-century American judges
University of Notre Dame alumni
Notre Dame Law School alumni
20th-century American politicians
Republican Party members of the United States House of Representatives from Indiana